The Yucatán Channel or Straits of Yucatán (Spanish: Canal de Yucatán) is a strait between Mexico and Cuba. It connects the Yucatán Basin of the Caribbean Sea with the Gulf of Mexico.

Currents
The Yucatán Channel separates Cuba from the Yucatan Peninsula of Mexico and links the Caribbean Sea with the Gulf of Mexico. Water flows through the Caribbean Sea from east to west. This flow consists of 5 Sv of water from the North Equatorial Current flowing through the Windward Passage and 12 Sv of water from the South Equatorial Current which flows along the coast of Brazil. The total flow is about 17 Sv at a temperature of at least . When this water flows past the Yucatán Peninsula it becomes the Yucatán Current. This current provides most of the inflow of water into the Gulf of Mexico as the amount of water entering by the Straits of Florida is small and intermittent. The Yucatán Current flows strongly on the western side of the channel while the Cuban Countercurrent flows in the opposite direction on the easterly side of the channel. Underneath the Yucatán Current there is a southward-flowing Yucatán Undercurrent which takes water away from the Gulf of Mexico.

Coral reefs
As the water flowing through the Yucatán Channel enters the Gulf of Mexico, it passes over the Campeche Bank, a shallow area of sea. The main reef-building corals here are Acropora cervicornis, Acropora palmata, and Montastraea annularis, and in the late 1990s many of these died. Some recolonisation has since taken place. The Campeche Bank is a biodiverse area, and this and other parts of the Yucatán Channel are heavily fished by artisan fishermen who converge on the area from along the coast of Mexico. The area is threatened by overexploitation.

See also

List of straits

References

Straits of the Caribbean
Bodies of water of Cuba
Bodies of water of Mexico
Gulf Coast of Mexico
Bodies of water of the Gulf of Mexico
Yucatán Peninsula
Borders of Mexico
Borders of Cuba
International straits